Andreychenko, Andrejchenko or Andreichenko is a Russian gender-neutral surname. Notable people with the surname include:

Andrey Andreychenko (born 1984), Russian politician
Natalya Andreychenko (born 1956), Russian actress
 (born 1988), Kazakhstani cyclist